Harbanspura railway station is  located in  Pakistan.

See also
 List of railway stations in Pakistan
 Pakistan Railways
Harbanspura Railways station is located in the Eastern Part of Lahore on the Lahore Wagah Border ( Attari ) track. It was established in 1892. The area is known after Raja Harbans Singh, a land lord  during the colonial period.  It gained more importance due hydrant units for cooling the steam engines. At the time of partition migrants from Pakistan and to Pakistan stayed there temporarily.  The station remained functional till late seventies.  Now it has been occupied by encroachers.

References

External links

Railway stations in Lahore District
Railway stations on Lahore–Wagah Branch Line